Hasle-Rüegsau railway station is a railway station in the municipality of Hasle bei Burgdorf, in the Swiss canton of Bern. It is located at the junction of the standard gauge Burgdorf–Thun and Solothurn–Langnau lines of BLS AG.

Services 
 the following services stop at Hasle-Rüegsau:

 Regio:

References

External links 
 
 

Railway stations in the canton of Bern
BLS railway stations